It's Gonna Be OK is the ninth studio album by Australian recording artist Adam Brand. The album was released in August 2010 and peaked at number 11 on the ARIA charts.  Additionally, It's Gonna Be OK became Brand's first No.1 on the ARIA Country chart.

Reception

Alexey Eremenko from AllMusic said "It's Gonna Be OK effectively blurs the line between country, heartland rock and the pop that made Bryan Adams a superstar in the late '80s." adding "The record is an enjoyable romp through arena-sized rockers and lighter, soft pop ballads, enlivened by a couple clever interludes such as the fiddle-driven "The Worm" or a couple of rockabilly-like tunes deeper into the album."

Track listing

Charts

Weekly charts

Year-end charts

Release history

References

2010 albums
Adam Brand (musician) albums
Albums produced by Richard Landis